Lee Jae-Min (Hangul: 이재민; born 29 May 1987) is a South Korean footballer who plays as forward for Byuksan FC.

Football career
Lee was a member of the Beograd Universiade national team when he studied in Korea University.

In 2010, Lee joined Korea National League club Ulsan Hyundai Mipo Dockyard. In July of the same year, he moved to Japanese club Vissel Kobe.

On 18 May 2011, he was released from Kobe, two days after being arrested for drunk driving.

In 2012 K-National League season, he was the top goal scorer by playing 24 games and scored 12 goals for Ulsan Hyundai Mipo Dockyard.

Lee joined China League One club Yanbian Baekdu Tigers F.C. on 29 January 2013.

Club statistics 
As of 7 December 2011

References

External links 

Living people
1987 births
Association football forwards
South Korean footballers
South Korean expatriate footballers
Ulsan Hyundai Mipo Dockyard FC players
Yanbian Funde F.C. players
Vissel Kobe players
Korea National League players
J1 League players
China League One players
South Korean expatriate sportspeople in Japan
Expatriate footballers in Japan
South Korean expatriate sportspeople in China
Expatriate footballers in China
Expatriate footballers in Thailand
Korea University alumni
People from Bucheon
Sportspeople from Gyeonggi Province